Neotropius is a genus of schilbid catfishes native to Asia.

Species
There are currently three recognized species in this genus:
 Neotropius acutirostris (Day, 1870)
 Neotropius atherinoides (Bloch, 1794) (Indian potasi)
 Neotropius khavalchor Kulkarni, 1952 (Khavalchor catfish)

References

Schilbeidae
Fish of Asia
Freshwater fish genera
Catfish genera